Lycium carolinianum, commonly known as Carolina desert-thorn or Christmas berry, is a species of flowering plant in the nightshade family, Solanaceae,

The plant produces small tomato-like fruits and is edible.

References

carolinianum